Nathan Fox (born 21 October 1990) is an English athlete specialising in the triple jump. Nathan is one of Great Britain’s most prestigious triple jump talents. After breaking the UK under 15 national record at 14, he became the first and only person of that age in British history to jump over 14meters (14.11m). Representing Great Britain as a schoolboy he placed 5th at the European Youth Olympics in 2007. He then went on to place 6th at the 2014 Commonwealth Games in Glasgow.

He also represented Great Britain at the 2017 World Championships.

His personal bests in the event are 16.81 metres outdoors (-1.4 m/s, Clermont 2017) and 16.53 metres indoors (Sheffield 2017).

International competitions

References

1990 births
Living people
English male triple jumpers
British male triple jumpers
World Athletics Championships athletes for Great Britain
Athletes from London
Athletes (track and field) at the 2014 Commonwealth Games
Commonwealth Games competitors for England